, provisional designation , is a trans-Neptunian object from the scattered disc located in the outermost region of the Solar System It was discovered on 29 October 2011, by astronomers with the Pan-STARRS survey at Haleakala Observatory, Hawaii, United States.

Orbit and classification 

 orbits the Sun at a distance of 38.1–66.5 AU once every 378 years and 5 months (138,225 days; semi-major axis of 52.32 AU). Its orbit has an eccentricity of 0.27 and an inclination of 29° with respect to the ecliptic. It is a scattered-disc object on a moderately eccentric orbit that never comes closer than 8 AU to the orbit of Neptune.

The body's observation arc begins with a precovery taken by the Sloan Digital Sky Survey in January 2003, or more than 8 years prior to its official discovery observation at Haleakala Observatory.

Numbering and naming 

This minor planet was numbered by the Minor Planet Center on 25 September 2018 and received the number  in the minor planet catalog. As of 2018, it has not been named.

Physical characteristics 

According to American astronomer Michael Brown and the Johnston's archive,  measures 266 and 267 kilometers in diameter based on an assumed albedo of 0.08 and 0.09, respectively. On his website, Brown lists this object as a "possible" dwarf planet (200–400 km), which is the category with the lowest certainty in his 5-class taxonomic system. As of 2018, no spectral type and color indices, nor a rotational lightcurve have been obtained from spectroscopic and photometric observations. The body's color, rotation period, pole and shape remain unknown.

References

External links 
 MPEC 2016-O125: 2014 CP23, Minor Planet Electronic Circular, 17 July 2016 
 M.P.E.C. statistics for F51 – All MPECs
 List Of Centaurs and Scattered-Disk Objects, Minor Planet Center
 Discovery Circumstances: Numbered Minor Planets (520001)-(525000) – Minor Planet Center
 
 

523683
523683
523683
20111029